"Homeward Borne" was an American television film broadcast on May 9, 1957, as part of the CBS television series, Playhouse 90. It was the 32nd episode of the first season.

Plot
A fighter pilot, Bob Lyttleton, returns home from war. He learns that his wife, Meg, has adopted a war orphan. He resents the child.

Cast
The cast included performances by:
 Richard Kiley as Bob Lyttleton
 Linda Darnell as Meg Lyttleton
 Keith Andes as Andy Colby
 Richard Eyer as Tommy Lyttleton
 Rene Korper as Ben
 Sarah Selby as Secretary
 Pauline Myers as Louise
 Steve Firstman as Paul

Production
The film was based on Ruth Chatterton's 1950 novel Homeward Borne.

Arthur Hiller was the director. Halsted Welles wrote the teleplay based Chatterton's novel. Gert Andersen was the director of photography, and Robert Swanson was the editor. The film was produced by Screen Gems for Playhouse 90.

References

1957 American television episodes
Playhouse 90 (season 1) episodes
1957 television plays